Tel H̱alif, formerly Tel H̱alifa (Arabic name: Tel el-Khuweilifeh) is an archaeological site, a mound (tell) in northern Negev area, west from kibbutz Lahav, Israel.

Albrecht Alt suggested that it is the location of the biblical town of Ziklag. Other evidence suggests Rimmon.

Excavcations around Tel Halif was among the research activities of the Cobb Institute of Archaeology as part of the Lahav Research Project arranged by Joe Seger in 1974.

See also
Battle of Tel el Khuweilfe

References

archaeological sites in Israel
Negev